Ron Griffin (born 27 June 1954) in Pomona, California is an American artist based in Venice, Los Angeles. 20 of his Works are by Museo Cantonale d'Arte of Lugano.

References 

Living people
1954 births
Artists from California